Salvia veneris, the Kythrean sage, is a species of flowering plant in the family Lamiaceae that is endemic to Cyprus. It is found in a very small area just west of the village of Kythrea. A study in 2004 found only approximately 4,000 surviving plants.

Salvia veneris has felt-like leaves growing in a basal rosette. The flowers are bi-colored, with the upper lip blue and the lower lip white with pale yellow markings. The stems give off a pleasant fragrance when crushed. The basal rosette leaf habit is unusual in the genus Salvia, and is thought to be an adaptation to grazing by goats.

References

Sources

veneris
Critically endangered plants
Endemic flora of Cyprus
Taxonomy articles created by Polbot